Eugénie Hamer (15 November 1865 – April 1951) was a Belgian journalist, writer and activist. Her father and brother served in the Belgian military, but she was a committed pacifist. The organization was founded in the belief that education, political neutrality, and women's suffrage were necessary components to peace. She was a participant in the 18th Universal Peace Congress held in Stockholm in 1910, the First National Peace Congress of Belgium held in 1913, and the Hague Conference of the International Congress of Women held in the Netherlands in 1915. This led to the creation of the International Committee of Women for Permanent Peace, subsequently known as the Women's International League for Peace and Freedom (WILPF). Hamer co-founded the Belgian chapter of the WILPF that same year. During World War I, she volunteered as a nurse and raised funds to acquire medical supplies and create an ambulance service.

Hamer published in various journals and magazines, writing on diverse topics including art, literature, music, the economy, education, history, and politics. As a journalist, she collaborated with several newspapers, including  (The City), L'Écho du Soir (The Evening Echo), and L'Avenir du Luxembourg (The Future of Luxembourg). As an internationalist, she later joined organizations with fostered friendship and cooperation between nations. Since her own pacifist leanings had been tested during the Occupation of Belgium, she often wrote about both domestic and international politics. She also published two books. Hamer was awarded the Victory and Commemoration Medal, the Civic Cross (1st class), and the Plaque of Honor by the Red Cross. Poland honored her as a knight of the Order of Polonia Restituta and Estonia bestowed upon her the level of knight of the Order of the White Star.

Early life and education
Eugénie Hamer was born on 15 November 1865 in Leuven, Belgium, to Eugénie (née Louvain) and Jean-Michel Hamer. Her father was a military officer who died when she was young. Her mother raised Eugénie and her brother Georges (born 1872), stressing the importance of a good education. Little is known of her early life, but the family moved to Antwerp and Hamer participated in literary circles and women's social reform activities.

Activism
The purpose of the organization was to promote pacifist and diplomatic resolution to controversy through educational initiatives presented to school children and the community. Baroness Florence de Laveleye (née Wheeler) served as the inaugural president of the alliance and Hamer was appointed as assistant secretary. In 1910, she and Laveleye were the Belgian delegates for the organization at the 18th Universal Peace Congress in Stockholm. She became the organization's general secretary in 1911 and vice president by 1915. Political neutrality and representation for women were so important to Hamer that she turned down a request in 1911 to join a federation proposed by Henri La Fontaine, a politician, pacifist, and later Nobel Peace Prize winner, to unite Belgian pacifist actions into a single organization. She presented a report on pacifism at the First National Peace Congress of Belgium in 1913, stressing the importance of education as a means to achieve peace and international cooperation.

During World War I, Hamer served as a nurse and organized fundraisers to establish an ambulance service and adequate supplies to care for the wounded. Her brother Georges served with distinction in the war and was wounded several times. She nursed him back to health. Hamer was known for her pacifism, but struggled with her patriotic feelings, advocating that peace could not occur until Belgium was liberated. The conference came about because the International Women Suffrage Alliance congress to be held in Berlin had been cancelled, so a committee of Dutch women, led by Aletta Jacobs, proposed that the Netherlands, as a neutral country, could host a meeting to allow women to maintain their solidarity. Hamer, and the alliance's treasurer, Marguerite Sarton, were persuaded to attend, because they did not want resolutions passed without the conference hearing from Occupied Belgium.

They drove to Essen, where they were frisked to the skin and then walked two hours to reach Roosendaal in the Netherlands. Catching a train there, Hamer and the four other Belgian attendees arrived after the congress had begun. As a symbol of the importance of cooperation, the German attendees, led by Anita Augspurg, suggested that all of the Belgian delegates be seated on the rostrum. Hamer agreed, on the condition that she was allowed to address the assembly. According to French socialist Jean Longuet, she spoke eloquently on the need for peace to be based on justice. Resolutions passed by the attendees reaffirmed the need for peace and called for no territorial transfers to be granted in a peace settlement without the consent of the population affected. Other resolutions called for creation of an international permanent council to peacefully work out differences between nations, involvement of women in the peace processes, and women's suffrage. 

Participants at the conference established the International Committee of Women for Permanent Peace, subsequently known as the Women's International League for Peace and Freedom (WILPF). Initially, Hamer and Sarton were the Belgian members of the international committee and their names appeared on the masthead. They established a Belgian chapter in 1915, but difficulties caused by the German occupation made communications difficult. After the war, Hamer once again became active in pacifist causes. In 1925, she and Marguerite Nyssens, worked to reestablish the Brussels chapter of the  but without success. Frequently writing about the relationship of Belgium with Poland and Slavic countries, Hamer joined and became secretary of the organization  (Belgian-Polish Friendship Committee). Both she and her brother participated in the ceremonies marking the unveiling in Antwerp in 1929 of the monument erected to honor fallen soldiers. Georges spoke and Hamer placed a wreath in honor of the officers who had died. Hamer also attended, along with other dignitaries, the opening of the Polish pavilion for the Liège Exposition of 1930, as a representative for the committee.

Career
Hamer published in various journals and magazines, writing on diverse topics including art, music, the economy, education, history, and juvenile crime. She also undertook literary studies on Belgian, English, and French writers, as well as literature in Slavic countries before the expansion of the Russian Empire. From 1919, she published historical analyses in the magazine  (The Belgian Fatherland). Hamer became an editor at the Catholic newspaper  (The City) in 1926. She was particularly interested in writing about politics, both domestically and internationally. In the 1930s, she contributed to newspapers and journals including L'Avenir du Luxembourg (The Future of Luxembourg) and Clarté' (Clarity).

Awards and honors
Hamer was awarded the Victory and Commemoration Medal and the Plaque of Honor by the Red Cross. In 1921 was honored by a royal decree with the Civic Medal (1st class), for her activities during the war. Poland honored her as a knight of the Order of Polonia Restituta in 1923 and in 1938 Estonia bestowed upon her the level of knight of the Order of the White Star, for her coverage in La Métropole.  

Death and legacy
Hamer's obituary appeared on 28 April 1951 in the newspaper Le Soir (The Evening''), confirming that she died in Antwerp. At the time of her death, she was remembered for her writing, as well as her pacifism and war service.

Selected works

See also
 List of peace activists

Notes

References

Citations

Bibliography
 

 

 
 

1865 births
1951 deaths
Writers from Leuven
20th-century Belgian journalists
Belgian pacifists
Belgian women's rights activists
Women's International League for Peace and Freedom people
Knights of the Order of Polonia Restituta
Recipients of the Order of the White Star
20th-century Belgian women writers
Belgian women activists
Belgian women journalists